The ARIA Albums Chart ranks the best-performing albums and extended plays in Australia. Its data, published by the Australian Recording Industry Association, is based collectively on each album and EP's weekly physical and digital sales. In 2012, twenty-two albums claimed the top spot, including Adele's 21 and Michael Bublé's Christmas, both of which started their peak positions in 2011. Ten acts achieved their first number-one album in Australia: Foster the People, Lana Del Rey, One Direction, Keith Urban, The Temper Trap, John Mayer, Karise Eden, Ed Sheeran, Birdy and The Amity Affliction.

One Direction earned two number-one albums during the year for Up All Night and Take Me Home. Taylor Swift's Red topped the charts for three consecutive weeks becoming her second number-one album on the chart. 21 was the longest-running number-one album of 2012, having topped the ARIA Albums Chart for nine weeks. Eden's My Journey topped the chart for six consecutive weeks, while Michael Bublé's Christmas, One Direction's Up All Night and Pink's The Truth About Love each spent five weeks at the number-one spot.

Chart history

Number-one artists

See also
2012 in music
List of number-one singles of 2012 (Australia)

References

2012
Australia Albums
2012 in Australian music